Tanja Stadler is a biostatistician and professor of Computational Evolution at the Swiss Federal Institute of Technology (ETH Zurich). She is known for her work in the field of phylogenetics.

Education and career
Tanja Stadler studied Applied Mathematics at the Technical University of Munich, the University of Cardiff, and the University of Canterbury. She obtained a Master degree in 2006 and a PhD in 2008 from the Technical University of Munich on 'Evolving Trees – Models for Speciation and Extinction in Phylogenetics' (with Prof. Anusch Taraz and Prof. Mike Steel). From 2008 to 2011, Tanja Stadler was a postdoctoral researcher with Prof. Sebastian Bonhoeffer in the Department of Environmental Systems Sciences at ETH Zürich. She was promoted to Group Leader in 2011. In 2014, she became Assistant Professor at the Department of Biosystems Science and Engineering of ETH Zürich in Basel, where she was promoted to Associate Professor in 2017 and to Full Professor in 2021.

Work
Tanja Stadler shaped the development of phylogenetic models and tools to understand evolutionary and population dynamic processes on different time scales. Her work in particular enabled the wide use of birth-death models in phylodynamics. Using these methods, Tanja Stadler addresses questions across a wide range of fields, including epidemiology and medicine, paleontology, species evolution, and language evolution.

Tanja Stadler and her group founded “Taming the Beast”, in 2016. Taming the Beast is both an international workshop series and an online resource, to teach the usage of the Bayesian phylogenetic software package BEAST 2.

During the COVID-19 pandemic, Tanja Stadler initiated and since then leads a Swiss-wide SARS-CoV-2 sequencing effort in March 2020. This effort was the only regular sequencing effort in the first year of the pandemic in Switzerland. Through this effort, the first beta, gamma, and delta variants in Switzerland were detected.

Tanja Stadler was president of the Swiss National COVID-19 Science task force  advising the authorities and decision makers of Switzerland from August 2021 until the termination of the task force in March 2022. She started the presidency after having been a member and later chaired the data & modelling group of the task force.

Awards
 2008. TUM PhD award
 2012. John Maynard Smith Prize of the European Society for Evolutionary Biology
 2013. ERC starting grant 
 2013. ETH Latsis Prize 
 2013. Zonta prize
 2016. ETH Golden Owl for teaching
 2021: SMBE Mid-Career Excellence Award.
 2021: Carus Prize of the German National Academy of Sciences Leopoldina
 2022: Rössler Prize

References

External links
 ETH Zürch Department of Biosystems Science and Engineering – Computational Evolution Group
 

Living people
German women academics
Academic staff of ETH Zurich
Phylogenetics
20th-century German mathematicians
German women mathematicians
1981 births
Scientists from Stuttgart
20th-century German women